is a former Japanese professional baseball player.

External links

1974 births
Living people
People from Yatsushiro, Kumamoto
Baseball people from Kumamoto Prefecture
Japanese baseball players
Nippon Professional Baseball infielders
Orix BlueWave players
Orix Buffaloes players
Japanese baseball coaches
Nippon Professional Baseball coaches